North Dakota Highway 67 (ND 67) is a  north–south feeder highway in southwest North Dakota, United States. The southern terminus is at U.S. Route 12 (US 12) in Scranton and the northern terminus is at ND 21 near New England.

Route description

Major intersections

See also

 List of state highways in North Dakota
 List of highways numbered 67

References

External links

 The North Dakota Highways Page by Chris Geelhart

067
Transportation in Bowman County, North Dakota
Transportation in Slope County, North Dakota